Jean Tortel (4 April 1904, Saint-Saturnin-lès-Avignon, Vaucluse – 2 March 1993) was a 20th-century French poet and essayist.

Works 
1931: Cheveux bleus, Albert Messein, Paris
1946: Élémentaires, Mermod, Lausanne
1947: Paroles du poème, Robert Laffont, Paris
1965: Les Villes ouvertes, Éditions Gallimard, Paris
1968: Relations, Gallimard
1971: Limites du regard, Gallimard
1973: Instants qualifiés, Gallimard
1984: Feuilles tombées d'un discours, éditions Ryôan-ji, Marseille, Prix France Culture
1986: Arbitraires espaces, Flammarion, Paris
1989: Des corps attaqués, Flammarion

References

External links 
 Jean Tortel/Fragment personnel on Remue net
 Les mots de la mort on Le Matricule des Anges
 Poems by Jean Tortel
 La mort de Jean Tortel, questionneur obstiné de la poésie on L'Humanité (4 March 1993)
 Jean Tortel on Babelio
 La présence de Jean Tortel on Érudit
 Limites du jardin : un parcours de la poétique de Jean Tort on Érudit

Prix France Culture winners
20th-century French poets
People from Vaucluse
1904 births
1993 deaths